Sectaurs: Warriors of Symbion was a line of action figures released by Coleco in 1985. Created by Lawrence Mass, Tim Clarke, and Maureen Trotto, the Sectaurs world blended humanoids with insects and arachnids. Marvel Comics released a limited series of Sectaurs comics, and the characters were also adapted for an animated miniseries.

Premise
"Somewhere in space, somewhere in time", a planet called Symbion is the site of a failed genetic experiment. Frightening changes take place that cannot be stopped. The result is a world where insects and arachnids grow to frightening proportions and the inhabitants have taken on their characteristics. Prince Dargon, ruler of the peaceful Shining Realm of Prosperon, and his allies are in conflict with the forces of Empress Devora, ruler of the Dark Domain of Synax, and her henchmen for possession of the Hyves, fortresses of an ancient civilization holding the key to ultimate power. Each character was "tele-bonded" with intelligent, non-anthropomorphic insect creatures called Insectoids that had a special ability, and shared each other's "pleasure and pain".

Action figures
Sectaurs was released by Coleco in 1985 (not 1984, as the stamp on the figures would suggest). Figures and insect companions were packaged together in a window box with weapons, a mini comic book and instructions. Some of these companions were large enough for the Sectaurs to ride, and were actually puppet-like, in which a hand could be placed inside a glove making up the lower body of the beast to manipulate the legs and an action feature. A second series of figures were designed and pictured in dealers' catalogues, but never produced due to the line's cancellation. The toy line did not do well partly because of the intimidating appearances of even the heroes and their companion beasts, and partially due to price points well above other action figure lines in stores at the same time.

Heroic Sectaurs of the Shining Realm
Dargon: Prince of the Shining Realm. He is bonded with a Flying Steed called Dragonflyer which has a biting action. His weapons included a broadskall sword, shield, twin venguns, and a slazor. Although Stellara is in love with Dargon, he secretly desires to marry Belana – the royal betrothed of his childhood friend Zak. An alternate figure was also released called Night Fighting Dargon, which had silver armor and antennae which glowed in the dark. Night Fighting Dargon included a Skall dagger, a Vengun, and trinoculars with lenses that glowed in the dark. The weapons were kept in ankle sheathes, rather than the standard belt holsters, enabling all of Dargon's weapons to be worn by one figure. Another insectoid companion, Parafly, was sold with Night Fighting Dargon as well, an Action Bug that attached to his back and featured flapping wings and a tail that glowed in the dark. Parafly appeared in one issue of the Sectaurs comic book, where he was depicted as more intelligent than common animalistic insectoids, and he temporarily granted Dargon the power to see in the dark. Night Fighting Dargon was the only figure actually released from the planned second wave of toys shown in catalogues.
Pinsor: A veteran warrior who rides the massive Battle Beetle, a Steed with two heavy front arms that close with a pincering action. Pinsor's weapons included a skall battle axe, sword, shield, and a Vengun. He suffered from unrequited love for Stellara, whose affections lay with Dargon.
Zak: Captain of Prosperon's Royal Guard, until his wisecracking insolence got him replaced. Zak's childhood friend is Dargon, who (secretly) doubles as his rival for Belana's affections. His companion, Bitaur, was an Action Bug with a biting action. Zak's weapons included a Slazor, a Vengun, and a Skall shield.
Mantor/Mantys: A "Keeper of the Way", a scholar of the ancient powers contained in the Hyves and the Ancients who created them. His companion beast is Raplor, an Action Bug with a grappling line that extends from its mouth and a winch action to rewind the cable. Mantor's weapons included a crossbow, vengun, and skall shield. Said to be an expert of the native Sectaurian martial art of Kai.
Stellara: A female warrior. In the comic book series, it was established Stellara's Insectoid died in battle some time ago and one story focused on her attempting to tele-bond with a new one, but was unable to complete the ritual because Dargon and the others were in danger. Nevertheless, the Insectoid she tried to tele-bond with aided her in saving them. In the comics, Stellara was a romantic interest of Pinsor, but she thought of him as a surrogate father; her true fondness was for Dargon. The two renditions of Stellara, despite sharing a name, were very visually different from each other. The unreleased Stellara figure from the planned second series of the toy line resembled her animated incarnation, and was to have included Rhine-Ox as her partner, an Action Bug with a headbutting feature. Her weapons were a Skall dagger, shield, and a Vengun.
Bodyball: A character seen only in the unreleased second wave of the toy line. Rather than being paired with an Insectoid, Bodyball was one of two figures planned to have a special action designed into the figure itself. He could be folded up, much like a pillbug, and visually seemed to be a member of a race other than his Sectaur compatriots. Pictures of the figure showed oddly shaped claw and shield weapons as his accessories.
Crossbow: The Shining Realm's Battle Bug, and part of the unreleased second line. Its projectile was a missile-like pod referred to as a "spear" in catalogue and package text.
Gyrofly: The only Creeper that was planned to be released for the Shining Realm faction in the unreleased second line. It was a scarab-like device which opened its shell and released a spinning propeller projectile named Attack-Gnat.

Evil Sectaurs of the Dark Domain
General Spidrax: Hideous leader of the Dark Domain's armies, armed with a whip coated in lethal poison. Unlike most Sectaurs, he enslaved his animal companion, Spider-Flyer, rather than form a bond with it. This was possibly because Spidrax had no forehead antennae (which all other Sectaurs possess) with which to initiate the tele-bonding process, but also to show his cruelty. Spidrax's weapons included a venom whip, Slazor, Skall shield, net, and twin Venguns. Spider-Flyer was a Flying Steed with biting mandibles. Like Dargon, the second wave of toys was to have featured a Night Fighting Spidrax, which included a staff weapon, boomerang, and attachable armor which glowed in the dark. Night Fighting Spidrax would have been paired with an Action Bug named Stranglebug, which was a spider with unusually long bendable legs that could be wrapped around a figure. Unlike Night Fighting Dargon, however, Night Fighting Spidrax went unreleased with the rest of the second series.
Skulk: Empress Devora's hideous and opportunistic stepson, who rides the spider-like Trancula, an extremely furry Steed with biting mandibles. His weapons included a Skall dagger, shield, Vengun, and dart wing.
Commander Waspax: Spidrax's rival. His Insectoid companion is Wingid, an Action Bug with flapping wings. His weapons included a Skall saber, shield, and Vengun.
Skito: A mercenary. His companion, Toxcid, is an Action Bug that squirts water from his proboscis, said to be "poison" in the context of the stories. His weapons included a Skall sword, shield, and Vengun.
Bandor: One of the unreleased second wave figures. Bandor included a flail, Skall sword, and shield. His insectoid was Swipe, which was an Action Bug with an extending proboscis weapon.
Knuckles: The other of the two figures in the second line which was to have had a built-in feature rather than an Insectoid. His feature was likely a punching action with his "Mutant Arm". Knuckle's accessories included some form of hand weapon, a shield, and two small Skalibur guns which attached to the sides of his helmet and connected to his weapons belt by power cables.
Fly Flinger: The Dark Domain's Battle Bug, from the unreleased second series. Its projectile was a glider-like second smaller insect generically named Fly.
Snag: One of two Creepers planned to be released for the Dark Domain in the unreleased second wave of toys. Snag featured a short grappling line that fired from its mouth and could be rewound into its body.
Axe-Back: One of two Creepers planned to be released for the Dark Domain in the unreleased second wave of toys. Ax-Back featured a blade-like protrusion that snapped up from its back.

The Hyve
The Hyve playset was also produced, and is one of the larger playsets released in the 1980s. Accessories included a boulder-like wrecking ball, a heavy Skalibur turret gun, a ladder, and a cage. It featured a landing pad with a trap door, a collapsible bridge, and an interior detailing a "Bio-Control Laboratory". The Hyve came with two Mutant Insectoids as guardians. Narr was a glove puppet, while Vypex was a smaller finger puppet. Narr and Vypex each had a cave from which they could "ambush" figures during play. Since each was a puppet, their rear anatomies did not exist in toy form. As a result, the penciler who worked on the comic book never drew the rear portions of their bodies. The rear edge of Narr's abdomen was always obscured by the foreground, while Vypex's serpentine body never ended.

Notable characters from the comics and other books
Belana: Zak's royal betrothed, who secretly (and mutually) desires Dargon.
Devora: Goddess-empress of the Dark Domain and stepmother of Skulk.
Galken: Rules the Shining Realm as a Regency, in the absence of his elder brother Markor. A politician, not a warrior. Uncle of Dargon.
Gnatseye: A warrior of the Shining Realm telebonded to an Insectoid named Jumpyr.
Hardyn: Galken's chief adviser.
Markor the Mighty: King of the Shining Realm, father of Dargon. Disappeared years ago searching for the Hyves.
Scorpia: A villainous Keeper, and Spidrax's half-sister.
Seacor: A headstrong youth featured in the animated miniseries. He's eager to prove himself to Dargon and Company; Seacor's Insectoid companion is Altifly.
Senrad: Devora's stealthy chief administrator. 
Slikk: This veteran thief is a loudmouthed troublemaker whose ribald jokes, outrageous lies, and embarrassing pranks make him less than popular with his fellow Sectaurs. Still, he's better company than the Dark Domain has to offer.

Glossary of terminology and locations

Blue Forest: product of the Great Cataclysm, east of Synax. Common deportation ground for convicted criminals, since all those who journey through this zone are subject to complete and absolute amnesia.
Citadel of Shadows: the first Hyve-gate shown in the comics. It lies halfway between Prosperon and Synax, but was destroyed by Mantor shortly after its discovery.
Creepers: Smaller insects said to be bred as living weapons. They were to be released as "role-play" scale toys in the unproduced second line; they fit over a user's hand, not as a puppet, but supposedly as a life-sized weapon. Each possessed an action feature similar to the Action Bug Insectoids. There were three Creepers:
Ax-Back (Dark Domain)
Gyrofly (Shining Realm)
Snagg (Dark Domain)
Dark Domain: a military dictatorship and homeland of the less human-appearing "evil" characters of the series.
Grimhold: dark fortress of Synax; residence of Empress Devora and family.
Synax: Capital of the Dark Domain.
Dart Wing: a spear of wing-buoyed skall guided as a weapon via telebond with its wielder. Each wing is razor-sharp and can cut like a sword.
Desert of the Lost: product of the Great Cataclysm; lies southeast of Prosperon and southwest of Synax, due south of Mount Symbion. Common deportation ground for convicted criminals, since all those who journey through this zone are subject to near-suicidal depression.
Forbidden Zone: basically, an uncharted area outside the hexagon boundaries that enclose all of known Symbion.
The Great Cataclysm: result of a failed genetic experiment, which ruined the Civilization of the Ancients on Symbion. Insects and arachnids grew to frightening proportions; Humans took on the characteristics of arachnids and insects, with the Sectaurs as the results.
Hyve: A mysterious, danger-filled fortress of the Ancients. Filled with guardian monsters and booby-traps, its wisdom is sought by good and evil Sectaurs alike. There are multiple gateways, or entrances, to the Hyve across Symbion; at least two exist within the hexagonal boundaries of the known world, and others are believed to exist in the Forbidden Zone beyond. The Hyve resembling the playset from the toy line – and guarded by Naurr and Vypex – is the second gateway visited in the comic series.
Insectoids: giant, mutated insects and arachnids that cohabit Symbion with the Sectaurs. They frequently serve as allies, pets and/or steeds of the Sectaurs. Various similar types include Steeds, Flying Steeds, Action Bugs, Battle Bugs, and Mutants.
Action Bugs: A term used in the toyline to denote the smaller partner Insectoids, which each possess a single button or crank activated feature. (Parafly has two special features, though one is simply parts that glow in the dark.)
Battle Bugs: A form of Insectoid which is low-slung and carries an artillery weapon atop itself, with a seat for a Sectaur rider. One Battle Bug was to be released for each faction in the unproduced second wave of the toyline, both with identically-shaped bodies, but with different spring-fired projectile weaponry mounted atop them. The two Battle Bugs were:
Crossbow (Shining Realm)
Fly Flinger (Dark Domain)
Flying Steeds: winged Insectoids large enough to be ridden by their Sectaur partners. In the toyline, Steeds are half-puppet figures, with a user's hand fitting into the legs of the toy and the middle finger operating some additional action feature. Additionally, they have flapping wings driven by a battery-powered motor.
Mutants: eternally-living insectoids created by the Ancients as guardians for the lost Hyve.
Steeds: Insectoids large enough to be ridden by their Sectaur partners. In the toyline, Steeds are half-puppet figures, with a user's hand fitting into the legs of the toy and the middle finger operating some additional action feature.
Lake of Blood: northeast of Prosperon and northwest of Synax. So-named because of a great air/sea battle fought there by the great-grandparents of King Markor and Empress Devora. Said battle cost nearly a million lives.
Meander: Also known as the Fog of Death, a product of the Great Cataclysm. A permanent valley of Meander was located southeast of Prosperon and southwest of Synax (beyond the Desert of the Lost) at the beginning of the comic series, protecting and hiding the second gateway to the Hyve, until it was dispersed using the power of the Hyve. A Meander was also seen early in the comic, accidentally released from the Hyve-gate known as the Citadel of Shadows. Exposure to this crimson fog results in prompt and violent corrosion of the flesh, unless protected by leaves of the Sentinel Plant.
Mount Symbion: highest elevation in known Symbion; . Located southeast of Prosperon and southwest of Synax, due north of the Desert of the Lost.
Sea of Acid: product of the Great Cataclysm, located west of Prosperon. Will promptly and violently corrode the flesh of all those foolhardy enough to swim in it.
Sectaurs: insect-evolved humanoid denizens of both the Shining Realm and the Dark Domain. They and the insectoids comprise, for the most part, the remnants of Symbionic civilization.
Shining Realm: a constitutional monarchy, and the homeland of the more human-appearing "good" characters of the series.
Lightkeep: shining castle of Prosperon; residence of the Royal Family.
Prosperon: Capital of the Shining Realm.
Symator: legendary double-edged "broadskall" [broadsword] of Prosperon, passed down from ruler to ruler for the past 20 generations. Dargon is its most recent owner.
Skalibur: a bio-energy beam weapon of lost Ancient technology. Skalibur weapons are often found within the Hyve-gateways.
Skall: shatterproof material grown as plant-like stalks and used almost exclusively in the manufacture of shields, armor and weapons (contact and edged). It is impervious to damage from venom.
Slazor: pneumatic projectile weapon throwing pellets capable of piercing Skall. Slazors also use "vengas" (compressed poison) ammunition; these pellets burst on impact into small, toxic clouds. The merest whiff of vengas infects its victims with bliss so glorious that it drives them insane; the victims slowly die witless.
Sting-Launcher: rubber-powered heavy weapon for firing spine-bombs or stun-spears. Commonly mounted on insectoid steeds. These weapons were carried by Battle Beetle in the animated series for the Sectaurs and used extensively, but were not present in either the comic incarnation nor the toy for Battle Beetle. Two types of ammunition were mentioned:
Spine-Bomb canister designed to explode and release hundreds of razor-sharp quills (technically, flechettes) at high velocity over a six-meter-diameter area (three meters in every direction).
Stun-Spears: used mostly to capture insectoids. One spear will paralyze a steed-size insectoid for an hour.
Sting Troopers: elite corps of Synax. With their swordsmanship and their cunning abilities at in-fighting, any one of them is rated a match for any ten ordinary Sectaur warriors. Commanded and trained by Waspax.
Swamp of Death: located south of the Sea of Acid and southwest of Prosperon.
Telebond: ability to share the mind and senses of another. This term is used exclusively in the comic to denote the deep mental bond of a Sectaur and Insectoid to each other, but in the toyline and mini-comics as also a blanket term for other lesser bondings, such as the secondary bond of Dargon and Parafly, or the mental attunement of a weapon such as a dart wing.
Vengun: spring-loaded gun for firing poison darts; range about forty meters. Its skall darts are filled with the venom of a creature called a Venipede.
Venipede: A giant insectoid, first discovered (by accident) in the Swamp of Death. Venom taken from a live Venipede is used to fill vengun ammunition.
Venom Whip: a poison-tipped weapon crafted from a Triceralon antenna. Like a vengun dart, the whip causes instant death if it breaks the skin.

Peerages
{| class="wikitable"
|-
! Rank || Shining Realm || Dark Domain || Notes
|-
| 1 || King/Queen || Emperor/Empress
|-
| 2 || Tribune || Grand Marshal; Warlord || Acts as deputy ruler, as with the shoguns of Japan 
|-
| 3 || Magistrate || Field Marshal; Warmaster
|-
| 4 || Bailiff || General
|-
| 5 || Prince/Princess || Brigadier
|-
| 6 || Duke/Duchess || Colonel
|-
| 7 || Marque/Marchioness || Commander
|-
| 8 || Count/Countess || Major
|-
| 9 || Viceroy || Captain
|-
| 10 || Baron/Baroness || Lieutenant
|-
| 11 || Thane; Warden || Ensign
|-
| 12 || Sheriff || Sergeant || Non-Commissioned Officer
|-
| 13 || Constable || Grenadier || Non-Commissioned Officer
|-
| 14 || Squire || Lancer/Scout
|-
| 15 || Yeoman || Musketeer/Spy
|}

Television series
In 1986, Ruby-Spears produced a five-episode miniseries:

 "Spidrax Attacks" (written by Dan DiStefano and Janis Diamond)
 "Slave City" (written by Dan DiStefano and Janis Diamond)
 "Valley of the Stones" (written by Dan DiStefano and Janis Diamond)
 "Trapped in the Acid Desert" (written by Ted Field)
 "Battle of the Hyve" (written by Matt Uitz and Janis Diamond)

Comic
Marvel Comics published an eight-issue series from 1985 to 1986. All of the stories were written by Bill Mantlo. Mark Texeira drew the first two issues and Steve Geiger drew issues 3-8.

Kickstarter campaign

A Kickstarter campaign started in 2018 to restart the franchise.

References

External links 
 
Sectaurs at Big Cartoon DataBase
Fansite
Sectaurs: Warriors of Symbion at Don Markstein's Toonopedia. Archived from the original on May 19, 2017.
Puppet building article about the design of Sectaurs toys
Article on the Hyve playset
Stellara777's Sectaurs Page (includes reviews and synopses of the comic books)
Comicbookdb Sectaurs page (list of all 8 issues of the comic)

1985 American television series debuts
1985 American television series endings
1980s American animated television series
1980s toys
Action figures
Television series by Ruby-Spears
Fantasy comics
Marvel Comics titles
Comics based on toys
First-run syndicated television programs in the United States
Animated television series about insects
Products introduced in 1985
American children's animated action television series
American children's animated space adventure television series
American children's animated science fantasy television series